Formula Xtreme may refer to:
 AMA Formula Xtreme, a defunct American professional motorcycle class
 Australian FX-Superbike Championship, an Australian professional motorcycle series formerly known as Formula Xtreme